Barry Palmer is an Australian musician, songwriter and record producer, based in Melbourne. Barry was a member of the band Hunters & Collectors, from 1988 to 1998.

History
Palmer began playing alongside his brother Craig Palmer and bluesman Chris Wilson in popular R&B band The Sole Twisters. He came to prominence as guitarist and songwriter for indie darlings, Harem Scarem and Crown of Thorns, later joining one of Australia's truly iconic bands Hunters & Collectors in 1989.

In 2005 he was the subject of a documentary series The Hit Game on ABC television, which showed him producing and developing four unsigned artists: Deepface who were later signed to Fly Records (a division of JJJ); Belinda-Lee Reid (ex-Lash) who was later signed to a substantial deal; Vanessa Morefea who later signed to Instant Karma in the UK; and finally the Wolfgramm sisters, who have toured with Jet and the Countdown series.

Palmer toured the globe and Australia for many years with Hunters & Collectors, the band selling over one million albums in their home territory and along the way writing and performing songs that have become a part of the Australian musical and cultural landscape. In recognition of their status within the Australian music community and their contribution to Australian music, 2005 saw Hunters & Collectors inaugurated into the ARIA Hall of Fame. Whilst still in Hunters & Collectors, Palmer formed Deadstar with Caroline Kennedy – releasing three albums to critical acclaim and radio success. From their first indie hits, such as "Going Down" and "Don't It Get You Down", to later pop songs like "Deeperwater" and "Run Baby Run", the band toured Australia and the UK until disbanding in 2001.

Palmer started his own 360º music production company and label, Gigantically Small in 2008 and co-wrote with, produced and worked with some of Australia's finest young artists.

2012 saw Palmer transitioning to mobile technology, co-founding a global tech start-up, Soundhalo, with his son Declan. Soundhalo is a real-time live concert HD video delivery mobile application, launched with artists such as Alt J and Thom York's Atoms For Peace.

Baz has since launched two more global tech start-ups including Weyo and more recently Vampr (musician social-professional network named by Fast Company in their Most Innovative Companies list 2022) with co-founder Josh Simons.

Hunters & Collectors reformed in 2013 for the AFL Grand Final performance followed by a run of shows around Australia in 2014, that saw the band also play support slots with Bruce Springsteen and The Rolling Stones.

Production
During this time Palmer wrote and sometimes produced songs with many other artists – "Cry" with The Mavis's (gold sales and APRA most performed song of the year), "Rip It Up" with 28 Days (gold), "Take Me Away" with Lash (lead track for US movie Freaky Friday with the soundtrack selling in excess of 500,000), "Love Comes Easy" with Vika and Linda (first single from Princess Tabu), "Home Again" and many others with old songwriting partner Mark Seymour (produced first solo album, King Without A Clue) and a swag of other songs with artists as diverse as Michael Spiby of The Badloves, Dan Brodie (producer, Beautiful Crimes, EMI), Tim Henwood of The Androids (producer/writer), Shihad, The Fauves, Amiel ("Tonight"), Lisa Miller, The D4 (writing and producing), Carly Binding (Mushroom/Warner), Luger Boa and Dash and Will.

Palmer continues to write and record, concentrating particularly on the artists signed to his production company, Gigantically Small.

2006 saw the release of Dirty Days for Jaed (The Devil's Music/Instant Karma, produced and arranged by Palmer), garnering rave reviews from the UK press.

Deepface (Fly Music) placed the highest Australian dance song on the ARIA dance charts for four months with "Been Good" (co-written by Palmer, C. Kennedy and A. Klippel) and was nominated for an ARIA award for Best Dance Release. The release of their album Feel The Love saw the trio debuting in the Billboard U.S Dance Charts top 50.

Missing Hours (originally signed by Palmer, later to Sony) produced by Palmer. Emma Hewitt disbanded the act in 2009 and headed to London to forge an incredibly successful trance career. In 2010 she won best trance vocalist at the Miami International Dance Music Awards.

The Coalition of the Young, produced by Palmer and signed to Gigantically Small. Declan has since moved on to form Declan and the Antics. 2011 sees Declan going solo and releasing his debut e.p in September.

Gigantically Small signed the wonderful Dash and Will in 2007 and then inked a deal with Universal.

2008 also saw Palmer co-write and produce an album for Jimmy Christmas of The D4 with his new band Luger Boa (Warner Music).

Matt Walters released an EP in February 2009, and his debut album produced by Paul McKercher in May 2011.

Palmer has most recently signed Boy in a Box and then licensed the band to Warner in May 2011.

Palmer's Gigantic Studios opened in 2011, but this studio was later taken over by Jan Skubiszewski.

List of bands
Sole Twisters (1983–1985)
Harem Scarem (1985–1989)
Crown of Thorns (1987–89)
Hunters and Collectors (1988–1998)
Deadstar (1995–2001)

Selected list of production credits
Deadstar
Mark Seymour (ex-Hunters and Collectors)
Christopher Marshall (ex-Harem Scarem)
Lisa Miller
Michael Spiby
Lash
The Fauves
Dan Brodie
Jaed
Shihad
Deepface (Executive Producer)
The Coalition of the Young
The SilverScene
Dash and Will
The Missing Hours
Jimmy Christmas' LUGER BOA
Valentiine
Buchanan

References

External links
Barry Palmer listing at the Australian Rock Database by Magnus Holmgren.

Living people
Australian songwriters
Musicians from Melbourne
Australian multi-instrumentalists
Hunters & Collectors members
Year of birth missing (living people)